Anjir Siah or Anjir-e Siah or Anjir-e Siyah or Anjir Seyah may refer to various places in Iran:
 Anjir Siah-e Olya, Kerman Province
 Anjir Siah, Gachsaran, Kohgiluyeh and Boyer-Ahmad Province
 Anjir-e Siah, alternate name of Anjir-e Sefid, Kohgiluyeh and Boyer-Ahmad Province